The Concerto for Clarinet is a composition for solo clarinet and orchestra by the American composer Joan Tower.  The work was commissioned by the Walter W. Naumburg Foundation for the clarinetist Charles Neidich, to whom the piece is dedicated.

Composition
The concerto has a duration of roughly 19 minutes and is composed in one continuous movement.  Tower described the piece in the score program note, writing:

Instrumentation
The work is scored for solo clarinet and an orchestra comprising two flutes (doubling piccolo), two oboes, two clarinets, two bassoons, four horns, two trumpets, trombone, bass trombone, tuba, timpani, two percussionists, harp, piano (doubling celesta), and strings.

Reception
The music critic John Henken lauded the concerto for its "remarkable" combination of "orchestral color and solo verve."  Susan Bliss of the Los Angeles Times also praised the piece, writing:

References

Concertos by Joan Tower
1988 compositions
Tower